Ankney is a surname. Notable people with the surname include:

C. Davison Ankney (1946–2013), Canadian zoologist and ecologist
Duane Ankney (born 1946), American politician
Moe Ankney (born 1942), American football player and coach
Pete Ankney (born  1932), American football coach